Bearing station is a BTS skytrain station, on the Sukhumvit Line in Bang Na District, Bangkok, Thailand. The station is located on Sukhumvit Road at Soi Bearing (Soi Sukhumvit 107), the last point of the BTS system in Bangkok Metropolitan Administration area, before passing the border pole to Samrong Nuea Town in Samut Prakan Province.

It is part of the 5.2 km Skytrain extension from On Nut station which opened on 12 August 2011. Between 2011 and 2017 it was the eastern terminus of the line, until the opening of Samrong station.

St. Andrews Sukhumvit 107 can be accessed from this BTS station.

See also
 Bangkok Skytrain

References 

BTS Skytrain stations